Runcinidae is a family of medium-sized sea slugs, marine opisthobranch gastropod mollusks.  They are headshield slugs, in the superfamily Runcinoidea (according to the taxonomy of the Gastropoda by Bouchet & Rocroi, 2005). 

This family has no subfamilies according to the taxonomy of the Gastropoda by Bouchet & Rocroi, 2005.

Genera
 Edmundsina Ortea, 2013
 Ildica Bergh, 1889
 Karukerina Ortea, 2013
 Lapinura Er. Marcus & Ev. Marcus, 1970
 Metaruncina Baba, 1967
 Pseudoilbia M. C. Miller & Rudman, 1968
 Rfemsia Chernyshev, 1999
 Runcina Forbes [in Forbes & Hanley], 1851
 Runcinella Odhner, 1924
 Runcinida Burn, 1963
Genera brought into synonymy
 Pelta Quatrefages, 1844: synonym of Runcina Forbes [in Forbes & Hanley], 1851 (Invalid: placed on the Official Index by ICZN Opinion 811)
 Runnica M. C. Miller & Rudman, 1968: synonym of Runcina Forbes [in Forbes & Hanley], 1851

References

External links

 Vayssière, A. (1885). Recherches zoologiques et anatomiques sur les mollusques Opisthobranches du Golfe de Marseille. Première partie. Tectibranches. Annales du Musée d'Histoire Naturelle de Marseille. 2(3): 1-181, pl. 1-6